Chalkboard is a font released by Apple in 2003. It was released as part of Mac OS X v10.3 and the 10.2.8 update. It is regularly compared to Microsoft's Comic Sans font, which has shipped with Mac OS since Mac OS 8.6 in 1999, although it is not a perfect substitute font since the two are not metrically compatible.

References

See also

Kristen (typeface)
Comic Sans

Casual script typefaces
Apple Inc. typefaces
Typefaces and fonts introduced in 2003